Juliomys rimofrons, also known as the cleft-headed juliomys, is a South American rodent species in the family Cricetidae. It is found in southern Brazil. The species is arboreal and lives in montane forests. It is threatened because of the small size and fragmentation of its current range. It's karyotype has 2n = 20, FN = 34.

References

Juliomys
Mammals described in 2002